Live Eschaton is the first video album by Polish extreme metal band Behemoth. While originally released on VHS in 2000, a reissue was released on DVD as Live Eschaton: The Art of Rebellion in 2002. Metal Mind Productions (MMP) also released a limited edition box set of Live Eschaton: The Art of Rebellion in 2009 (limited to 2000 copies), which contains the concert on DVD with extras and a bonus CD containing the concert's audio.

Track listing

Original VHS recording and CD reissue

DVD reissues 
The DVD reissues feature the band's discography at that time with album artwork and track listings, band and individual member biographies, an interview with Nergal, a slideshow of photos while the band is performing live, four exclusive wallpapers in Satanica artwork style (which are available in the "DESKTOP" folder located on the DVD), artwork from various demos, EPs and albums, stylistic variations of the band's logo, as well as details about the band's and their label's former websites. MMP retained the legal rights to re-release the original material in the future, which included their 2002 and 2009 DVD reissues. However, the band itself only lists the original VHS release in the official discography on their webpage due to the inclusion of unauthorized additional material in the DVD releases.

Personnel

Release history

References 

Concert films
Behemoth (band) video albums
2000 live albums
2000 video albums
Live video albums
Metal Mind Productions video albums